Colleen Mayer is a former Canadian politician and member of the Legislative Assembly of Manitoba, who represented the electoral district of St. Vital as a member of the Progressive Conservative Party of Manitoba from 2016 until 2019. St. Vital was an open seat in the 2016 Manitoba general election, with incumbent MLA Nancy Allan not seeking re-election.

On August 1, 2018, Premier Brian Pallister appointed Mayer to the Executive Council of Manitoba as Minister of Crown Services.

Mayer lost her seat to New Democrat Jamie Moses, who contested the seat in 2016, in the 2019 election. She subsequently accepted a position with STARS Air Ambulance as the Director of Development for Manitoba.

Electoral history

References

Living people
Politicians from Winnipeg
Progressive Conservative Party of Manitoba MLAs
Women MLAs in Manitoba
21st-century Canadian women politicians
Year of birth missing (living people)